This is a list of the municipalities in the province of Guadalajara, in the autonomous community of Castilla–La Mancha, Spain.

See also

Geography of Spain
List of cities in Spain

 
Guadalajara